Stevie Salas (born November 17, 1964) is a Native American guitarist, author, television host, music director, record producer, film composer, and former advisor of contemporary music at the Smithsonian National Museum of the American Indian.

Career
Salas was born on November 17, 1964, in Oceanside, California, United States. He is of Apache ancestry.

In 1989, Stevie was credited in Bill & Ted's Excellent Adventure as performing the guitar solo of the character Rufus (played by George Carlin) in the closing scene. Stevie's hands were also featured performing the solo, according to the film's end credits.

In 1990, Salas released his first solo album Stevie Salas Colorcode, opening for Joe Satriani and his 1989 album Flying in a Blue Dream. Salas' music received attention in both Japan and Europe.

In 1993, he released Stevie Salas Presents: The Electric Pow Wow, a covers album of songs that inspired Salas as a youth featuring guest artists like Zakk Wylde, Glenn Hughes, T.M. Stevens, Richie Kotzen and Slim Jim Phantom. Then in 1994, Salas released Back from the Living in Japan, where his singles "Start Again" and "Tell Your Story Walkin" were released. During this time, he also appeared on the album Rats by then girlfriend Sass Jordan.

Salas was touring guitarist for Rod Stewart´s Out of Order Tour where he got the inspiration for his book ˝When We Were the Boys˝, a book of memories from touring world stages.

In 2001, Mick Jagger hired him as guitarist and music director for Jagger's "Goddess in the Doorway" Tour. Later that year Salas released Shapeshifter: The Fall and Rise of Stevie No Wonder.

In 2003, he released The Soulblasters of the Universe, and did his first European Colorcode tour since 1999.

From 2006 to 2010, Salas served as music director and consultant for American Idol and 19 Entertainment nurturing Kris Allen, Adam Lambert, Chris Daughtry, and their respective touring bands for subsequent American tours.

Salas began working as host and executive producer of the Canadian Music TV series Arbor Live for APTN. In mid-2009, Salas co-founded with the internet entrepreneur Laurence Dorazio the company Rockstar Solos, LLC which focuses on iPhone and iPad gaming and entertainment application development.  The first application also called Rockstar Solos became available in the iTunes Store in December 2009. The company Rockstar Logic has thousands of downloads to date.

In 2009, Salas worked with T.I and Justin Timberlake on the song "Dead and Gone", the single eventually reaching #2 on the US Billboard Charts. Later that year, Salas received a Native American Lifetime Achievement Award at the Native American Music Awards. From 2010 to 2012, he served as the advisor to contemporary music at National Museum of the American Indian. He co-created both the Up Where We Belong-Natives In Popular Culture exhibit and The Living Earth Festival. In 2012 Salas created and is executive producer of Catch The Dream Bios with Adam Beach for APTN with shows airing 2014.

Salas is Executive Producer of 'RUMBLE: The Indians Who Rocked the World', a Native American music documentary for PBS and Super Channel. (2017 Sundance winner for Masterful Storytelling ). Executive Producer and Creator of Dreamcatcher Bios (currently in production). Produced by Rezolution Pictures Montreal Canada for APTN television.
Co-Wrote and Produced the new project/band INABA/SALAS with Japanese superstar vocalist, multi-instrumentalist and songwriter Koshi Inaba for the Japanese record label Vermillion Records. Chubby Groove album was released on January 18, 2017 and was the #2 album in the country that week, and remained in the top 10 for several weeks after. The album was supported by sold-out Chubby Groove Tour 2017 that played throughout Japan in January/February 2017. The record was certified Gold in Japan on October 4, 2017.

On February 15, 2020, Inaba/Salas released their second album, titled Maximum Huavo.

Musical influences
Salas' musical influences are derived mainly from late 60s and 70s rock and roll music, as well as funk. Artists who have influenced Salas as a musician include James Brown, Jimi Hendrix, Mick Ronson, David Bowie, and Frank Black.

Discography

Solo career

Studio albums

EPs

Live albums

Compilations

Group projects
Hardware – Stevie Salas with Bootsy Collins and Buddy Miles

Nicklebag – Stevie Salas with Bernard Fowler

Inaba/Salas – Stevie Salas with Koshi Inaba

Guest appearances
1986 – George Clinton: R&B Skeletons in the Closet (Capitol Records)
1988 – Bootsy Collins: What's Bootsy Doin'? (Columbia Records)
1988 – Was (Not Was): What Up, Dog? (Chrysalis Records)
1988 – Eddie Money: Nothing to Lose (Columbia Records)
1988 – The Pandoras: Rock Hard EP (Restless Records)
1988 – Phil Cristian: No Prisoner
1989 – Shakespears Sister: Sacred Heart (FFRR Records)
1989 – Shakespears Sister: "You're History" single (FFRR Records)
1989 – Cats in Boots: KickedClawed
1989 – The Burns Sisters: Endangered Species (Columbia Records)
1990 – Ronald Shannon Jackson: Red Warrior (Axiom Records)
1991 – Mister Fiddler: With Respect
1992 – Sass Jordan: Racine (MCA Records)
1992 – Steve Thomson: Steve Thomson
1992 – Jeff Healey Band: Feel This (Arista Records)
1993 – Terence Trent D'Arby featuring Des'ree: "Delicate" single (Columbia Records)
1994 – Sass Jordan: Rats (Impact Records)
1995 – TM Stevens: Out of Control... BOOM!!!
1995 – Terence Trent D'Arby: Vibrator (Columbia Records)
1995 – Red Thunder: Makoce Wakan
1996 – Cassius Slade: Land of Opportun-ists
1997 – Anri: Twin Soul (For Life Music)
1997 – TM Stevens: Radioactive
1997 – Carmine Appice: Guitar Zeus 2: Channel Mind Radio
1997 – Munetaka Higuchi with Dream Castle: Free World
1998 – Tomoya with 3T: "Eternal Flame" single (Universal Music Japan)
1998 – Taisuke: Heavy Pop
1998 – Robert Williams: Date with the Devil's Daughter
1998 – Tokio: Graffiti (Sony Japan)
1999 – Michael Hutchence: Michael Hutchence (V2 Records)
1999 – Glenn Hughes: The Way It Is (SPV/Nippon Crown/Shrapnel Records)
2000 – Takul: Nuclear Sonic Punk
2000 – Jeff Healey Band: Get Me Some (Eagle Records)
2001 – TM Stevens: Shocka Zooloo
2002 – Andy Dick: Andy Dick and the Bitches of the Century
2003 – Chris Catena: Freak Out
2003 – Ken Tamplin and Friends: Wake the Nations
2004 – Koshi Inaba: Peace of Mind
2005 – OctavePussy: Here Are the Results of the Universal Jury
2006 – Bernard Fowler: Friends with Privileges (Sony Japan)
2008 – T.I. feat. Justin Timberlake: "Dead and Gone" single (Atlantic/WEA)
2009 – Heavy Glow: "It's Too Late" (StockXChange Music Australia)
2020 – Chris Catena's Rock City Tribe: "Truth in Unity" (Grooveyard Records)

Signature equipment
LAA Custom Nishi Drive Stevie Salas Signature Overdrive Pedal
Framus Idolmaker Stevie Salas Signature Guitar
The Guyatone Stevie Salas Wah Rocker Pedal

References

External links
 
 Stevie Salas biography by Greg Prato, discography and album reviews, credits & releases at AllMusic
 Stevie Salas discography, album releases & credits at Discogs
 Stevie Salas biography & filmography at IMDb
 Stevie Salas albums to be listened as stream on Spotify

1964 births
Place of birth missing (living people)
Living people
American film producers
American film score composers
American male film score composers
American funk guitarists
American male guitarists
American people who self-identify as being of Native American descent
Record producers from California
American rock guitarists
American session musicians
American television personalities
American television producers
Island Records artists
Mass Mental members